Teen Time was an Australian television series which aired from 1959 to 1961. It was hosted by Keith Walshe and Carol Finlayson, and as was often the case with Australian music television series of the era, it aired on only a single station, in this case ATN-7. The series presented a mix of live music performances and records, and had a live audience. Dig Richards and the R'Jays appeared on Tuesdays, while Warren Williams appeared on Fridays. There are no copies of the series existing to date as TV at the time did not hold copies. They were copied over to save film. The only footage that exists of this TV show is a home movie held by the National Film and Sound Archive of Australia.

See also
Hit Parade
Six O'Clock Rock
Youth Show

Seven Network original programming
1959 Australian television series debuts
1961 Australian television series endings
Black-and-white Australian television shows
English-language television shows
Pop music television series
Australian live television series